Gregory Durand (born 8 December 1977) is a French former short track speed skater. He competed in two events at the 2002 Winter Olympics.

References

External links
 

1977 births
Living people
French male short track speed skaters
Olympic short track speed skaters of France
Short track speed skaters at the 2002 Winter Olympics
Sportspeople from Montreuil, Seine-Saint-Denis
21st-century French people